WDWZ (89.3 FM) is a radio station licensed to serve the community of Andalusia, Alabama. The station is owned by B. Jordan Communications Corporation. It airs a News/Talk radio format.

The station was assigned the WDWZ call letters by the Federal Communications Commission on September 3, 2012.

References

External links
 Official Website
 

DWZ
Radio stations established in 2012
2012 establishments in Alabama
News and talk radio stations in the United States
Covington County, Alabama